Eliyahu Golomb (2 March 1893 – 11 June 1945). Born in Volkovysk, Belarus. After emigrating to Palestine he joined Hashomer, an underground Zionist militia, in 1916. He became one of the leaders of the Jewish defense effort in Mandate Palestine and chief architect of the Haganah, the underground military organization for defense of the Yishuv between 1920 and 1948. His son David later served as a member of the Knesset.

References

1893 births
People from Vawkavysk
Ashkenazi Jews in Mandatory Palestine
Belarusian Jews
Jews from the Russian Empire
Emigrants from the Russian Empire to the Ottoman Empire
Mandatory Palestine people of Belarusian-Jewish descent
Haganah members
Members of the Assembly of Representatives (Mandatory Palestine)
1945 deaths
Palmach members
Jewish National Council members
People of the 1936–1939 Arab revolt in Palestine
Yishuv during World War II
Burials at Trumpeldor Cemetery